Fernand Le Heurteur (27 September 1905 – 12 December 1989) was a French long-distance runner. He competed in the marathon at the 1936 Summer Olympics.

References

1905 births
1989 deaths
Athletes (track and field) at the 1936 Summer Olympics
French male long-distance runners
French male marathon runners
Olympic athletes of France
Place of birth missing
20th-century French people